Joel Levi (born August 25, 1938 in Kfar Sirkin, League of Nations Mandate for Palestine; died June 15, 2014 in Ramat Gan) was an Israeli lawyer.

Life 
Joel Levi's parents emigrated to Palestine in the 1930s. He studied law in Tel Aviv at the time of the Eichmann trial and completed his legal clerkship with Gabriel Bach. From 1964 he practiced law in his own firm in Tel Aviv. He specialized in restitution proceedings for victims of National Socialism. Since the Washington Declaration in 1998, Levi has also been increasingly entrusted with cases of restitution of looted art.

Levi was a founding member and long-time board member of the German-Israeli Lawyers Association (DIJV/IDJ). He received the Federal Cross of Merit First Class in 2007.

Levi was the initiator of the exhibition Anwalt ohne Recht about the fate of Jewish lawyers in the Third Reich and the initiator of the book Zu Recht wieder Anwalt.

Writings (selection) 
Die Arisierung jüdischer Anwaltskanzleien. In: Anwälte und ihre Geschichte : zum 140. Gründungsjahr des Deutschen Anwaltvereins. Mohr Siebeck, Tübingen  2011, ISBN 978-3-16-150757-1, S. 305–314.
Nachwort. In: Barbara Sauer, Ilse Reiter-Zatloukal (Hrsg.): Advokaten 1938 : das Schicksal der in den Jahren 1938 bis 1945 verfolgten österreichischen Rechtsanwältinnen und Rechtsanwälte. Manz, Wien 2010, ISBN 978-3-214-04194-6.
Die Rolle der jüdischen Rechtsanwälte in der Weimarer Republik. In: „Juden ist der Beruf des Rechtsanwalts verschlossen“ : (§ 1 der 5. VO zum Reichsbürgergesetz v. 27.09.1938); Dokumentation zur Ausstellung „Anwalt ohne Recht – Schicksale jüdischer Anwälte in Deutschland nach 1933“ in Hamm vom 3. September bis 20. Oktober 2008. Rechtsanwaltskammer, Hamm 2010, S. 36–78.

Literature 
Peter Münch: Viel Arbeit, viel Genuss. In: Süddeutsche Zeitung. 28. Dezember 2013, S. 13.
Hans Bergemann (Hrsg.): Zu Recht wieder Anwalt : jüdische Rechtsanwälte aus Berlin nach 1945. Hentrich & Hentrich, Berlin 2012, ISBN 978-3-942271-73-8.

References

External links 
Rechtsanwalt Joel Levi gestorben. DIJV, 17. Juni 2014.
Traueranzeige. In: Der Tagesspiegel. 22. Juni 2014.
Restitution von Carl Blechens Gemälde "Waldlichtung mit kleinem Weiher und liegendem Hirten", Koordinierungsstelle Magdeburg, 7. Juli 2012.

See also 
Aryanization
List of claims for restitution for Nazi-looted art
The Holocaust
Nazi Germany

1938 births
2014 deaths
People from Tel Aviv
Israeli lawyers
Officers Crosses of the Order of Merit of the Federal Republic of Germany